Vail Lake is a large reservoir in western Riverside County, southern California.

Geography
It is  located on Temecula Creek, in the Butterfield Valley, south of Oak Mountain, of the Black Hills, in the Santa Margarita River watershed.

Vail Lake is supplied by storm water runoff from Kolb, Temecula, and Wilson Creeks.  Surface water stored in the lake is used to help replenish local ground water supplies through recharge operations.

Flora
Land near Vail Lake is the only known native habitat of the endemic and endangered flowering shrub Ceanothus ophiochilus, which was named the Vail Lake ceanothus when it was discovered in 1989.

History

The property surrounding Vail Lake is privately owned, and recreational access to the lake is privately controlled.  The Butterfield Country Recreation Park was established in 1968 to provide public access to the lake and its marina, but the park was closed by its owners in 1989.  In 1995, a members-only resort facility was opened at the location of the former park; and in 2000, the area was re-opened to the public on an annual-fee basis.  Recreational activities at Vail Lake include fishing, boating, RV, mountain biking, miniature golf and swimming.

See also 
 List of dams and reservoirs in California
 List of lakes in California

References 

Reservoirs in Riverside County, California
Dams in California
United States local public utility dams
Temecula, California
Reservoirs in California
Reservoirs in Southern California